Peter Pucker (born February 8, 1988 in Sankt Veit an der Glan, Carinthia) is an Austrian football player who currently plays for Austria Klagenfurt.

Before joining SK Austria Kärnten he played youth soccer for SK Maria Saal, BNZ Kärnten and FC Kärnten.

References

1988 births
Living people
People from Sankt Veit an der Glan
Austrian footballers
Austrian Football Bundesliga players

Association football midfielders
Footballers from Carinthia (state)
SK Austria Kärnten players
SK Austria Klagenfurt players